Islandreagh is a townland of 392 acres in County Antrim, Northern Ireland. It is situated in the civil parish of Grange of Nilteen and the historic barony of Antrim Upper.

History
The name of the townland was recorded variously as Islanereagh in 1669 and Island Reagh in 1780.

People
Alec Cooke, Baron Cooke of Islandreagh (1920-2007) was a Northern Ireland politician created a life peer as Baron Cooke of Islandreagh in the County of Antrim, on 11 August 1992. He lived at Islandreagh House in Dunadry.

See also 
List of townlands in County Antrim

References

Townlands of County Antrim
Civil parish of Grange of Nilteen